Clemens Schoppenhauer (born 23 February 1992) is a German former professional footballer who played as a centre-back.

Career
In 2005, Schoppenhauer joined SV Werder Bremen as a youth and went on to progress through the club's youth teams. From 2010 until 2014, he played for the reserves. In 2010, he was called up to the first-team squad for a Champions League match against Tottenham Hotspur.

In May 2017, Schoppenhauer signed a two-year contract with FC St. Pauli.

On 5 January 2019, Schoppenhauer joined VfR Aalen on a one-and-half year deal.

In July 2019, Schoppenhauer moved to Bremen-based club FC Oberneuland, newly promoted to the Regionalliga Nord.

He announced his retirement from playing in May 2021.

References

External links
 
 

1992 births
Living people
Sportspeople from Bremerhaven
Association football defenders
German footballers
Germany youth international footballers
3. Liga players
2. Bundesliga players
SV Werder Bremen II players
Würzburger Kickers players
FC St. Pauli players
VfR Aalen players
Chemnitzer FC players
FC Oberneuland players
Footballers from Bremen (state)